Sergey Yurievich Sudeikin, also known as Serge Soudeikine (19 March 1882 in Smolensk – 12 August 1946 in Nyack, New York), was a  Russian artist and set-designer associated with the Ballets Russes and the Metropolitan Opera.

Biography 
Having been banned from the Moscow School of Painting, Sculpture and Architecture for his "obscene drawings", Sudeikin joined the Mir Iskusstva movement. His close friends included the poet Mikhail Kuzmin and the impresario Serge Diaghilev, at whose invitation he came to Paris in 1906 for the Salon d'Automne Exhibition, where his work was first shown abroad. From 1907 to 1918 he was married to actress Olga Glebova (1885–1945), one of the famed beauties of St Petersburg and the closest friend of Anna Akhmatova. Glebova-Sudeikina is the principal character and addressee of Akhmatova's longest work, The Poem Without Hero (1940–65).

Sudeikin designed the sets and costumes for Diaghilev's production of La tragédie de Salomé by Florent Schmitt in 1913, and assisted in the execution of Nicholas Roerich's designs for Stravinsky's The Rite of Spring the same year. By the time of the October Revolution Sudeikin was among the foremost theatrical designers in Russia. In 1913 he had eloped to Paris with the dancer Vera de Bosset, whom he subsequently married, and who in the 1920s left him to become the mistress and ultimately second wife of Stravinsky.

In 1926 he prepared artwork for the 1926 Broadway production of Nikolai Evreinov's The Chief Thing. Soudeikine later designed the settings for the original Theatre Guild production of Porgy and Bess that first opened on Broadway at the Alvin Theatre in New York City on October 10, 1935.

External links

 
Russian biography
Guide to Serge Sudeikin Drawings at Houghton Library, Harvard University
Sergei Soudeikine set designs for cinema, 1938-1939, held by the Billy Rose Theatre Division, New York Public Library for the Performing Arts

20th-century Russian painters
Russian male painters
Modern artists
1882 births
1946 deaths
American people of Russian descent
White Russian emigrants to the United States
Bisexual painters
Russian LGBT painters
20th-century Russian male artists
Moscow School of Painting, Sculpture and Architecture alumni